Gymnocoidum is a genus of calcareous alga known from Permian strata.  For details of its classification, see Gymnocodiaceae.

References 

Enigmatic red algae taxa
Fossil algae
Red algae genera